The 2019 Copeland Borough Council election took place on 2 May 2019 to elect members of the Copeland Borough Council in England. They were held on the same day as other local elections.

Result Summary

Ward results

Arlecdon & Ennerdale

Beckermet

Black Combe & Scafell

Cleator Moor

Corkickle

Distington, Lowca & Parton

Egremont

Gosforth & Seascale

Hillcrest

Kells

Millom

Moor Row & Bigrigg

Moresby

Sneakyeat

St. Bees

Whitehaven Central

Whitehaven South

References

2019 English local elections
May 2019 events in the United Kingdom
2019
2010s in Cumbria